The Boys is a 1998 Australian drama film directed by Rowan Woods. The screenplay by Stephen Sewell is based on the play by Gordon Graham, with Graham influenced by the 1986 murder of Anita Cobby, with the play first performed by Griffin Theatre Company under the direction of Alex Galeazzi.

Plot
After serving time in prison for an assault on a liquor store employee, Brett Sprague is released from prison and returns home to his two brothers and his and their girlfriends, mother and stepfather. Things have changed, and as Brett begins to drink his way through the day, he regains his "top-dog" position one argument at a time. This power trip gets Brett and his brothers united in rage against their girlfriends and mother, and they are involved in a heinous crime. The aftermath of the night unfolds through the story with flashforwards.

Cast
 David Wenham – Brett Sprague
 Toni Collette – Michelle
 Lynette Curran – Sandra Sprague
 John Polson – Glenn Sprague
 Anthony Hayes – Stevie Sprague
 Jeanette Cronin – Jackie
 Anna Lise Phillips – Nola
 Pete Smith – George
 Sal Sharah – Nick

Production
The Boys is Rowan Woods' directorial debut, and actor Peter Hehir's last film before he retired from acting. Woods "aimed to achieve a combination of documentary-style naturalism with the edge of a thriller." Woods also said that the first time he read the play, he felt "it was an Australian story that had to be told. (…) This is the inside story of a family in crisis, of three boys on the day before a nasty crime takes place, of which they are accused."

The producer of the film, Robert Connolloy, had also produced the play. He met Rowan Woods at film school, and they both suggested to John Maynard they make the movie. The script was adapted by playwright Stephen Sewell.

Shooting was done on location in a rented house in Maroubra, one of Sydney's Eastern Suburbs. The location used to shoot the scene of the heinous crime was filmed at the Eastlakes Shopping Centre in Eastlakes, another eastern suburb.

Accolades
The original music score is composed by The Necks, with other music contributed by sound designer Alan Lamb.

See also
 Cinema of Australia
 The Boys (soundtrack album)
 List of Australian films

References

External links
 
 
The Boys at Oz Movies
 
The Boys at the National Film and Sound Archive

1998 films
1998 crime drama films
Australian crime drama films
Australian independent films
Drama films based on actual events
Films directed by Rowan Woods
Films set in Australia
Films shot in Sydney
1998 directorial debut films
1998 independent films
1990s English-language films